Keith Brian Oakes (born 3 July 1956) is an English former professional footballer. His clubs included Peterborough United, Newport County and Gillingham.

At Newport County Oakes was selected in the 1980 Fourth Division PFA Team of the Year and captained the team that won promotion and the Welsh Cup and in the subsequent season reached the quarter-final of the 1981 European Cup Winners Cup.

He completed a bachelor's degree in Physiotherapy at the University of Salford and in the summer of 1991 succeeded Bill Harvey as physiotherapist at Peterborough United. In 1997, he became the physiotherapist at Lincoln City and had a brief spell as co-caretaker manager after the sacking of Phil Stant in 2001.

He returned to Peterborough United as physiotherapist in June 2006, but he left in May 2010.

References

● Playfair football annuals 1973-74 to 1991-92

1956 births
Living people
English footballers
English Football League players
Bedworth United F.C. players
Peterborough United F.C. players
Newport County A.F.C. players
Gillingham F.C. players
Fulham F.C. players
Boston United F.C. players
Peterborough United F.C. non-playing staff
Lincoln City F.C. non-playing staff
Association football physiotherapists
Alumni of the University of Salford
People from Bedworth
Association football defenders